Jim Dewey was a Canadian ice hockey player.

Dewey was a member of the Saskatoon Quakers who represented Canada at the 1934 World Ice Hockey Championships held in Milan, Italy where they won Gold.

See also
List of Canadian national ice hockey team rosters

References

Canadian ice hockey players
Saskatoon Quakers players